{{DISPLAYTITLE:C11H12O3}}
The molecular formula C11H12O3 (molar mass: 192.21 g/mol) may refer to:

 Carpacin
 4-(4-Methylphenyl)-4-oxobutanoic acid
 Myristicin
 Ocean propanal
 Quercinol

Molecular formulas